The 2001 Asian Cycling Championships took place at Kaohsiung and Taichung, Taiwan from 8 to 15 July 2001.

Medal summary

Road

Men

Women

Track

Men

Women

Medal table

References
 Road Results
 Track Results

Asia
Asia
Cycling
Asian Cycling Championships
International cycle races hosted by Taiwan